Maryna Volodymyrivna Lazebna (born 10 June 1975) is a Ukrainian civil servant and politician. On 4 March 2020, she was appointed as the Minister of Social Policy of Ukraine.

Biography 
In 1998, she graduated from Kyiv University. Holds the title of Candidate of Economic Sciences.

She worked at the Ministry of Economy, the Secretariat of Cabinet of Ministers and the Ministry of Social Policy.

From 2013 to 2014, Lazebna headed the State Employment Service.

From 2015 to 2019, she worked in the project “Modernization of the social support system of Ukraine”.

From August to October 2019, Lazebna was the chairman of the State Social Service.

See also 
 Shmyhal Government

References

External links 

 
 Ministry of Social Policy (in Ukrainian)

1975 births
Living people
People from Kyiv Oblast
Taras Shevchenko National University of Kyiv alumni
Ukrainian civil servants
Labor and social policy ministers of Ukraine
Independent politicians in Ukraine
Women government ministers of Ukraine
21st-century Ukrainian women politicians
21st-century Ukrainian politicians